Jerril Galban Santos is the current Consul general at the Philippine Consulate General, Houston.  Previously, he was the Chief of Mission of the Philippine Embassy in Vietnam which he assumed in 2009. He has been with the Department of Foreign Affairs since the 1980s and is a recipient of the Gawad Mabini, with a rank of Dakilang Kasugo (2007) and the Order of Sikatuna, with a rank of Datu (2009). He was among the Outstanding Fernandino Award honorees in 2012.

References

Ambassadors of the Philippines to Vietnam
Living people
Filipino diplomats
Year of birth missing (living people)